The initialism QXL may stand for:

 QXL, ("quick sell"), a former name for the Tradus online auction company
 QXL, the QEMU QXL video accelerator - a paravirtualized framebuffer device for the  SPICE protocol